Jaime Manuel Penedo Cano (born 26 September 1981) is a Panamanian former professional footballer who played as a goalkeeper for various teams such as: Osasuna B, CSD Municipal, LA Galaxy, Deportivo Saprissa and Dinamo București, among others, but also for the Panama national team, being the goalkeeper of the first squad of Panama that ever played in a World Cup. Penedo announced his retirement on 24 January 2019.

Club career
Penedo began his career with Estudiantes de Panamá F.C. and made his first team debut in 2000. He also played in Panamá for Plaza Amador and Árabe Unido. In his first season with Árabe Unido, Penedo helped the club to the apertura and clausura titles. In summer 2005 he joined Italian club Cagliari but did not make any first team appearances. The following season, he moved to Spain to play for Osasuna B in Segunda División B. After one season in Spain, Penedo returned to Central America, signing in Guatemala for Municipal. During his time with Municipal Penedo claimed four league titles.

On 5 August 2013, the 2015 CONCACAF Gold Cup Bronze medal winning goalkeeper signed with the LA Galaxy. He made his Galaxy debut on 7 August 2013 in a mid-season friendly against AC Milan in the inaugural International Champions Cup. Penedo and the LA Galaxy terminated his contract and parted ways on 29 July 2015.

International career
Penedo made his debut for Panama in June 2003 as a substitute for Francisco Portillo in a 1-0 win over Cuba. He has, as of 11 July 2015, earned a total of 122 caps including an unofficial match against Mexico in 2007, scoring no goals. He represented his country in 26 FIFA World Cup qualification matches and was a member of the Panamanian 2005 & 2013 CONCACAF Gold Cup team, who finished second in both tournaments. Penedo won the golden glove at the 2005 CONCACAF Gold Cup and the 2013 CONCACAF Gold Cup, which is given to the best goalkeeper of the tournament.

In 2018 he was named in Panama's 23-man squad for the 2018 FIFA World Cup in Russia. He started in all three of Panama's matches. After the World Cup, he announced his resignation from international duty.

Honours

LA Galaxy
Major League Soccer: Winner: 2014

Dinamo București
Cupa Ligii: Winner: 2016–17

Panama
CONCACAF Gold Cup: Runner-up: 2005, 2013

Individual
 CONCACAF Gold Cup Golden Glove Award: 2005, 2013
 CONCACAF Gold Cup Bext XI: 2005

Career statistics

International

Personal life
Penedo officially married Angie Malca in August 2013 and they married in church in January 2015. They have a son, Jaime Matías.

See also
 List of men's footballers with 100 or more international caps

References

External links
Player profile  - CSD Municipal

Player profile - LA Galaxy

1981 births
Living people
Sportspeople from Panama City
Panamanian people of Spanish descent
Panamanian footballers
Panama international footballers
Association football goalkeepers
2005 UNCAF Nations Cup players
2005 CONCACAF Gold Cup players
2007 UNCAF Nations Cup players
2007 CONCACAF Gold Cup players
2009 UNCAF Nations Cup players
2009 CONCACAF Gold Cup players
2011 Copa Centroamericana players
2011 CONCACAF Gold Cup players
2013 Copa Centroamericana players
2013 CONCACAF Gold Cup players
2014 Copa Centroamericana players
2015 CONCACAF Gold Cup players
2018 FIFA World Cup players
Copa América Centenario players
Copa Centroamericana-winning players
FIFA Century Club
C.D. Plaza Amador players
C.D. Árabe Unido players
Cagliari Calcio players
CA Osasuna B players
C.S.D. Municipal players
LA Galaxy players
Deportivo Saprissa players
FC Dinamo București players
Liga Panameña de Fútbol players
Serie A players
Segunda División B players
Liga Nacional de Fútbol de Guatemala players
Major League Soccer players
Liga FPD players
Liga I players
Panamanian expatriate footballers
Panamanian expatriate sportspeople in Costa Rica
Panamanian expatriate sportspeople in Guatemala
Panamanian expatriate sportspeople in Italy
Panamanian expatriate sportspeople in Romania
Panamanian expatriate sportspeople in Spain
Panamanian expatriate sportspeople in the United States
Expatriate footballers in Costa Rica
Expatriate footballers in Guatemala
Expatriate footballers in Italy
Expatriate footballers in Romania
Expatriate footballers in Spain
Expatriate soccer players in the United States